The Guerrilla is a 1908 American silent short drama film directed by D. W. Griffith.

Cast
 Arthur V. Johnson as Jack Stanford
 Dorothy West as Dorothy
 George Gebhardt as Confederate Soldier
 Charles Inslee as Servant
 Owen Moore
 Harry Myers
 Herbert Yost (Barry O'Moore)) as Confederate Soldier / Union Soldier
 Mack Sennett as Confederate Soldier / Union Soldier
 Harry Solter as Confederate Soldier / Union Soldier

References

External links
 

1908 films
1908 drama films
1908 short films
Silent American drama films
American silent short films
American black-and-white films
American Civil War films
Films directed by D. W. Griffith
1900s American films